Anna Redka (born 21 January 1989) is a former Ukrainian handball player for Ukrainian national team.

References

1989 births
Living people
Ukrainian female handball players
Sportspeople from Kyiv